The Supreme Electoral Court of Costa Rica (TSE), is the supreme election commission of the Republic of Costa Rica. The Electoral Court was established in 1949 by the present Constitution of Costa Rica.

Role 
The Electoral Court is independent of any other body and consists of three judges appointed by the Supreme Court of Justice to serve six-year terms. During the election period, the size of Electoral Court is expanded to five judges. Since its establishment, the Electoral Court has provided for transparent elections and is constitutionally responsible for organizing elections and assuring the integrity of their results.

History 
The Cádiz Constitution of 1812 established Costa Rica's first elections. 

Politics of Costa Rica
Political organizations based in Costa Rica
Elections in Costa Rica
Institutions of Costa Rica
Electoral courts
Tribunals